Alpheias conspirata is a species of snout moth in the genus Alpheias. It was described by Carl Heinrich in 1940 and is known from Mexico.

References

Moths described in 1940
Cacotherapiini
Moths of Central America